(also written 2006 HJ123) is a trans-Neptunian object (TNO). It was discovered in 2006 by Marc W. Buie. The object is a plutino (in 2:3 resonance with Neptune).

Physical properties

References

External links 
 
 

469987
Discoveries by Marc Buie
20060427